Thomas William Birtle (28 March 1926 – 1 January 2010) is a former English cricketer.  Birtle was a right-handed batsman who bowled right-arm fast-medium.  He was born at Norton-on-Tees, County Durham, and was educated at Stockton-on-Tees Secondary School.

Birtle made his debut in county cricket for Durham against Northumberland in the 1946 Minor Counties Championship.  He made a further appearance in that season for the county against the Yorkshire Second XI.  He later played for Nottinghamshire, making his first-class debut against Kent in the 1952 County Championship.  He made six further first-class appearances for the county, all of which came in that season, with his final appearance coming against Warwickshire.  As a bowler, struggled with the ball in his seven first-class appearances for the county, taking 8 wickets at an average of 74.12, with best figures of 2/68.  With the bat, he scored 12 runs at a batting average of 2.40, with a high score of 4 not out.  Having left Nottinghamshire following the 1952 season, Birtle later returned to Durham, where he appeared just once more for the county, in the 1955 Minor Counties Championship against Cumberland.

Outside of cricket he worked for Imperial Chemical Industries and Pickering Lifts.  He died at the University Hospital of North Tees at Stockton-on-Tees, County Durham, on 1 January 2010.  He was survived by his wife and son.

References

External links
Tom Birtle at ESPNcricinfo
Tom Birtle at CricketArchive

1926 births
2010 deaths
People from Norton, County Durham
Cricketers from County Durham
English cricketers
Durham cricketers
Nottinghamshire cricketers